"Formal Invite" is the second single from Ray J's album This Ain't a Game. It peaked at #35 on Billboard magazine's Hot R&B/Hip-Hop Singles Sales chart. Bobby Brown, Philly's Most Wanted, Tweet from Next and Derek Fisher of the Los Angeles Lakers made cameo appearances in the video shot for the song.

Track listings

Notes
 denotes additional producer

Charts

References

2001 songs
2002 singles
Ray J songs
Song recordings produced by the Neptunes
Songs written by Chad Hugo
Songs written by Pharrell Williams
Atlantic Records singles
Songs written by Ray J